Drew Mechielsen (born August 19, 1997) is a Canadian cyclist in the BMX discipline.

Career
In 2018, Mechielsen had four top ten finishes during the World Cup circuit. Mechielsen has competed at three World Championships in 2017, 2018 and 2019, finishing 27th, 34th and 37th respectively. In 2019, Mechielsen competed at the 2019 Pan American Games, finishing in seventh place.

In July 2021, Mechielsen was named to Canada's 2020 Olympic team.

References

External links
 
 
 
 

1997 births
Living people
BMX riders
Canadian female cyclists
Olympic cyclists of Canada
Cyclists at the 2020 Summer Olympics
Pan American Games competitors for Canada
Cyclists at the 2019 Pan American Games
Sportspeople from Surrey, British Columbia
20th-century Canadian women
21st-century Canadian women